Mario Prišć (born 18 February 1974) is a retired Croatian football midfielder.

Career
He began his career in NK NAŠK, and he also played in NK Croatia Đakovo before he moved to NK Osijek in 1998. He played there for three excellent seasons. In NK Osijek he got a very good reputation and as a result, he got transferred to Rapid Wien in 2001. He joined NK Rijeka in 2004 and he spent there three seasons. In December 2007. he was released on a free transfer and then he rejoined his home club NK NAŠK where he began his football career. Later he moved to NK FEŠK where he finished his football career.

Honours
Osijek
Croatian Football Cup (1): 1999

Rijeka
Prva HNL runner-up (1): 2005-06
Croatian Football Cup (2): 2005, 2006
Croatian Football Super Cup runner-up (2): 2005, 2006

External links
Mario Prišć profile at Nogometni Magazin 
Profile at Rapidarchiv.at

1974 births
Living people
People from Našice
Association football midfielders
Croatian footballers
NK Osijek players
SK Rapid Wien players
HNK Rijeka players
Croatian Football League players
Austrian Football Bundesliga players
Croatian expatriate footballers
Expatriate footballers in Austria
Croatian expatriate sportspeople in Austria